Ashley Anthony Chin (born 21 August 1982), also known by his stage name Muslim Belal, is an English actor, screenwriter, spoken word poet and rapper of Jamaican descent.

He began his acting career in the 1999 BBC film Storm Damage and his music career in 2005. He has acted in a number of stage productions including Gone Too Far! (2007). Chin came to prominence as a supporting role in the films Sket (2011) and Anuvahood (2011). He is perhaps best known for his role as Tyson in the film Victim (2011) and Michael in the award-winning short film The Boxer. Chin also played the role of the antagonist, G-Money, in The Intent (2016), and reprised his role in the prequel The Intent 2: The Come Up (2018). He played the role of Isaac in the short film series The Essence (2019). Chin has also released a book titled Faith in October 2019 and states that the book is based on his journey from the streets to Islam. A film based on the book is set to be released in 2022 and Chin is set to write and direct the film.

With music and poetry, Chin performs under his alias "Muslim Belal" and released his debut studio album, Pray Hard in 2009. He released his second album The Transition in 2010. His third studio album My Sumaya was released in 2015. Chin's poetry combines spiritualism with social issues and his own personal history. He also works as a life coach and delivers workshops and talks at youth clubs, universities and events.

Early life and education
Chin was born in Gypsy Hill, London, England. His parents are from Jamaica, he was named after his paternal grandfather who was Chinese. He grew up with his mother, Andrea Ellis, and elder sister, Kareena Chin, in a South London council estate. He was brought up as a Christian, however spent his youth being involved in gang culture.

Chin achieved an A grade in GCSE drama and left school at the age of 15. In 1999, Chin and his family moved to Thornton Heath, Croydon.

Chin had a talent for poetry, which he started developing from the age of 12. In 2001, he and a friend set up a music studio, for a band, where Chin used to play keyboards and different sound boards. The former street gang and musical collective was called SMS 'South Man Syndicate' (later known as South Muslim Soldiers), and he was known at the time as Smalls.

Career

1999–2006: Beginnings
In 1999, Chin began his acting career in the BBC film Storm Damage directed by Lennie James. He then made his theatre debut as the role of Young Mal in Roy Williams' Lift Off at the Royal Court Theatre. Chin converted to Islam in 2002, during this time he stepped away from his career to focus on his faith. Since his conversion to Islam, Chin has adopted the name Muslim Belal. In December 2005, under this stage name, he performed at the inaugural Global Peace and Unity Event in the ExCeL Exhibition Centre organised by Islam Channel.

2007–2009: Return to Acting and Pray Hard
Chin returned to acting in 2007, where he played Razer in Bola Agbaje's Laurence Olivier award-winning play Gone Too Far!. Laurence Olivier was impressed with Chin's performance that he made him reprise his role in 2008. He also played the role of Carl Wilkins in Roy Williams' There's Only One Wayne Matthews at the Polka Theatre. In August 2007, he played the role of Seales in BBC Radio 4's radio adaptation of E. R. Braithwaite's novel To Sir, With Love. Chin also starred in a supporting role in the television seriesThe Bill in 2007. He also had supporting roles inHolbyBlue, The Fixer, and Law & Order: UK during this time

In July 2008, Chin performed at the Islam Expo in Olympia, London. In February and March 2009, he toured with other Nasheed artists, including Mecca2Medina and Poetic Pilgrimage on the "I am Malcolm X Tour". In 2009, he released From the Streets to Islam, a CD in which he is being interviewed and responds to the questions by rapping. This was a preview to launching his first album. In the same month, a collaborative charity single "Feed the World, Feed the Fasting" was released by Muslim Aid. The song featured Chin along with artists Rizwan Hussain, Abdullah Rolle, Khaleel Muhammad, Labbayk and Mecca2Medina. In October and November 2009, he supported Shaam on their UK tour. Ashley Chin released his debut studio album Pray Hard on 15 August 2009 by Halal Dawa Records under his alias Muslim Belal. Chin's poetry combines spiritualism with social issues and his own personal history. The album features themes of repentance, his conversion to Islam, giving advice, praising Allah, preparations for the hereafter and supplicating to Allah.

2010–2014: The Transition and Victim
In October 2010, he performed at the Global Peace and Unity Event, where he also launched his second album The Transition. The album had a guest appearance from Lowkey and was released on 23 October 2010. In February 2011, Ashley Chin took his talents to the United States and performed at the Saint Louis University Muslim Student Association Annual Conference. This performance was the first of its kind and developed an international audience.

In 2011, Chin co-wrote  and starred in Victim in a lead role with Michael Maris. On 22 June 2012, the film was released in UK cinemas. The film also stars Ashley Madekwe, Jason Maza, and co-stars Adam Deacon, David Harewood and Giggs. The film is about a young man's attempts to move away from a life of violent crime, with the help of a wholesome country girl who comes to stay with his friend in the city, only to find himself the target of retaliation. Chin also had supporting roles in the shows Waking the Dead, Silent Witness and Casualty.

Chin had supporting roles in the 2011 films; Cherry Tree Lane and Anuvahood, and also a cameo in Sket. He was also selected as the 2010 Trailblazer at the Edinburgh International Film Festival for the role of Asad in Cherry Tree Lane. In April 2012, Chin co-starred in The Boxer, a seven-minute short film, alongside Paul Barber. The film was the winner for "Project 7" It was directed by Henry Blake, written by Daniel Bailey and produced by Scruffbag Productions. The film is about the relationship between a young man and his grandfather. It premiered on 17 April 2012 at the Lexi Cinema in Kensal Rise, London along with the runner-up of "Project 7", premiered during a special screening

From October to December 2012, he played the role of Escalante in Frank McGuinness's Damned By Despair, the English translated version of Tirso de Molina's 1625 play El Condenado por Desconfiado, at the Royal National Theatre. In October and November 2012, he was involved in filming of Destiny Ekaragha's adaptation of Bola Agbaje's play Gone Too Far.

From May to August 2013, he played the role of Mercutio in a National Theatre production of William Shakespeare's Romeo and Juliet in Ben Power's version for young audiences.

In November 2013, he performed at the Global Peace and Unity Event, where he launched his very best of compilation album Black Slave. He also played a supporting roles in Fedz and Starred Up during this time. Chin starred and wrote in Pressure. A short film released on Valentine's Day in 2014. It premiered through GRM Daily.

2015–present: My Sumaya and Faith
Chin released third album My Sumaya on 19 May 2015. It is a charity album with all the proceeds going towards feeding the most vulnerable children in Eastern Sudan. The album was named after his daughter.

He starred in the 2016 film The Intent alongside Scorcher, Krept and Konan. He reprised his role in the 2018 prequel The Intent 2: The Come Up, released in 2018. The film also starred Ghetts and Popcaan. Chin also had a supporting role in EastEnders. Where he played the role of Sam in 2 episodes. After a year long hiatus from music, Chin released the single Life on 6 January 2019.

Chin worked with Giggs to write and release a short film in promotion of his album Wamp 2 Dem. The Essence is a short film that was released on 12 April 2019 on Giggs' YouTube channel that is inspired by the soundtrack of Wamp 2 Dem. It was written by Michael 'Buck' Maris, Ashley Chin and April Walker and directed by Myles Whittingham.  Chin also played a lead role in the film and Giggs makes a cameo appearance. Chin worked with Giggs before for the film Victim.

Ashley Chin released an autobiography titled Faith in October 2019. Chin stated that he learnt more from travelling the world than he did from school. Saying that "I spoke about my life and changed peoples lives. Yesterday I was born, today I live, tomorrow I die. I put it all in a book for them to remember me by". The following month in November 2019, Chin announced that he is directing and writing a movie based on the book. It is a coming of age story about a South London boy who finds faith in Islam to escape gang life. He travels to Egypt to find his faith in life again but he must return to keep a commitment to his best friend's, fatherless daughter and face the past.  It's a feature film based on the true story of Ashley Chins life. It follows the life of a young South London boy Ash, and his journey to finding the meaning in life and discovering the religion of Islam. It stars Hope Ikpoku, Keira Chansa and Fady Elsayed and is set to be released in 2022.

Personal life
In 2002, at the age of 19, Chin converted to Islam. In 2004, he travelled to Egypt and lived there for a year to study Islam.

His mother and elder sister have also converted to Islam. He is a Manchester United Football Club fan.

In June 2010, Chin performed Umrah (the second largest Islamic pilgrimage to Mecca, Saudi Arabia). Between July 2011 to May 2012, Chin resided in Kuwait City, Kuwait.

In July 2013, he appeared on Channel 4's Ramadan Reflections. In February 2014, Chin set up a charity ABC Life. In June 2014, he visited Pakistan to deliver a lecture and record television interviews at Dreamworld Family Resort in Karachi.

Filmography
Film

Television

Stage

Radio

Discography
Albums

Non-album tracks

See also
British hip hop
Islamic music
List of converts to Islam
List of performance poets

References

External links

Muslim Belal on Paradex
Allen, Annika. Ashley Chin. Flavour Magazine. 25 March 2011
Muslim Belal – From Kuwait And Beyond. Tawheed Is Unity. 28 January 2012
Ashley Chin. Spotlight
Reed, Becky. Interview: Victim Star/Writer Ashley Chin. DIY Film. 21 June 2012
Lais, Hasnet. Interview: Ashley Chin a.k.a. Muslim Bilal. "Victim movie is released in cinemas nationwide today 22nd June". The Muslim Post''. 22 June 2012

1982 births
Living people
English Muslims
English people of Chinese descent
English people of Jamaican descent
Converts to Sunni Islam from Christianity
English former Christians
Performers of Islamic music
English spoken word artists
Muslim poets
British hip hop singers
English hip hop musicians
English male rappers
Black British male rappers
English male television actors
English male stage actors
English male film actors
English male radio actors
20th-century English male actors
21st-century English male actors
Black British male actors
English screenwriters
English male screenwriters
21st-century English writers
British male actors of Chinese descent
English motivational speakers
Male actors from London
Rappers from London
People from the London Borough of Lambeth
People from Thornton Heath
21st-century British screenwriters
21st-century English male writers